Forward Networks, Inc. is an American company founded in Palo Alto, California and headquartered in Santa Clara, California. The company develops enterprise software for network management and software-defined networking.

History 
Forward Networks was founded by David Erickson, Nikhil Handigol, Brandon Heller, and Peyman Kazemian, who met as Ph.D researchers at Stanford University. While operating software-defined networking deployments running OpenFlow at the university, Erickson, Handigol, Heller, and Kazemian built a software platform based on Kazemian's research at Stanford for his electrical engineering dissertation. Kazemian's research enabled the use of configuration data and operational state information from devices on a network to create a virtual copy of that network.

Until November 2016, the company operated in stealth mode and raised $16 million in funding by DFJ, with participation from Andreesen Horowitz.

In October 2019 the company raised $35 million in Series C funding led by Goldman Sachs, also a customer of the company.

In January of 2023, following 139% year-over-year growth, Forward Networks announced it closed $50M in Series D funding. The round was led by MSD Partners with support from new investors, Section 32 and Omega Venture Partners.

Forward Networks' other customers include PayPal, Ubisoft, and Telstra.

Intent-based networking 
Intent-based networking (IBN), a term coined by Gartner in 2017 describes a system designed to automate a network lifecycle from design and implementation to deployment and validation.

Forward Networks' technology focuses on verification with regards to intent-based networking. The platform generates a mathematical model of the network to perform functions such as composing timestamped collections of network configurations and state information of a network infrastructure. The product is marketed as a network assurance platform called Forward Enterprise.

See also 

 SolarWinds
 Infoblox
 Red Hat
 IP Fabric

References 

Software companies based in California
2013 establishments in California
Companies based in Palo Alto, California
American companies established in 2013
Software companies established in 2013
Software companies of the United States